Kong Quan (born November 1955) is a Chinese diplomat and politician who served as Chinese Ambassador to France and Monaco from 2008 to 2013.

He is a member of the 13th National Committee of the Chinese People's Political Consultative Conference.

Early life and education
He is the seventy-six grandchildren of Confucius. He attended the Affiliated School of Beijing Foreign Studies University, and graduated from the University of Mons, University of Antwerp and the École nationale d'administration.

Career
Kong joined the Foreign Service in 1977 and has served primarily in Western Europe. In 2002, he became director of the Information Department of the Ministry of Foreign Affairs, and held that office until 2006. He subsequently served as director of the Department of European Affairs, and soon reappointed assistant minister of Foreign Affairs.

He was Chinese Ambassador to France in March 2008, in addition to serving as Chinese Ambassador to Monaco. 

Honours and awards
 18 May 2013  Legion of Honour

Personal life 
Kong married Wang Yingying, who bore him a daughter.

References

1955 births
Living people
People from Puning
University of Antwerp alumni
École nationale d'administration alumni
People's Republic of China politicians from Guangdong
Chinese Communist Party politicians from Guangdong
Ambassadors of China to France
Ambassadors of China to Monaco
Members of the 13th Chinese People's Political Consultative Conference